Marcin Urbaś (born September 17, 1976 in Kraków) is a former Polish track and field athlete. He is the Polish record holder for the 200 metres dash with 19.98 seconds. He is now a sprinting coach.

Track and field
Urbaś is the Polish national record holder over the half-a-lap (19.98 seconds in the semi-final of the 1999 World Championships in Seville, Spain. Urbaś is one of the four Polish athletes who brought the Polish national records in dashes up-to-the global standards: Marian Woronin 10.00 (9.992) over 100 m; Marcin Urbaś 19.98 over 200m; and Tomasz Czubak and Robert Maćkowiak over 400 m, 44.62 and 44.84, respectively. Urbaś improved the Polish national record of 20 years by Leszek Dunecki.

Results and honors
He won the  gold medal over a lap indoor in the European Indoor Championships in 2002, and the bronze medal in 2005.
Urbas has been part of the Polish national 4 × 100 m relay who won the silver medal during the European (outdoor) Championships in 2002.

Competition record

Other achievements
SPAR CUP: European National Teams' (Men's) Super League:
200 m: Bronze in 2006; Silver in 2002; Bronze in 2001; Gold in 1999;
4 × 100 m relay: Gold in 2006

Music
Aside of his sport career he is a vocalist in Polish death metal band Sceptic. Marcin Urbaś recorded with them three albums:
"Blind Existence (1999)", "Unbeliever's Script (2003)" and "Nailed to Ignorance" (2022).

Retirement
After Mr. Tadeusz Osik refused to include him on the Polish national 4 × 100 m relay for the 2008 Summer Olympics, Urbas was removed from the list of the members of The Polish national track and field team; therefore, PZLA or the Polish Track and Field Association did stop supporting him financially.  Because of the lack of financial support, Mr. Urbas as of 2009 has retired as a professional athlete. Mr. Urbas did claim that he would have been able of running close to his Personal Best of 19.98s over 200 meters (20.1—20.2 over 200m) only if, he would be capable of investing into himself around 80,000 zlotya or, at the time, around 25,000 dollars.

The Newest Job
Mr. Urbas is a co-owner of the Urban Sprint Group (in Poland) and, in particular, helps with the Projekt Elita Rugby 7: Rio 2016. The goals of Mr. Urbas are to, in general, help Polish runners, all over Poland, run smarter and achieve their goals; and in particular, to help the Polish national Rugby team in qualifying to the Olympics in 2016.

See also
 Polish records in athletics
 2002 European Athletics Championships
 2002 European Athletics Indoor Championships
 1999 World Championships in Athletics – Men's 200 metres

References

External links

 Marcin Urbaś Running and Physical Education School - Urban Sptint Group
 Urbaś sings in a duet
 The same song sung solo, by Patrycja Jankowska, with pictures of Mr. Urbaś

1976 births
Living people
Sportspeople from Kraków
Polish male sprinters
Athletes (track and field) at the 2000 Summer Olympics
Athletes (track and field) at the 2004 Summer Olympics
Olympic athletes of Poland
European Athletics Championships medalists
Universiade medalists in athletics (track and field)
Universiade gold medalists for Poland
Competitors at the 1999 Summer Universiade
Medalists at the 2001 Summer Universiade